Craibia atlantica is a small tree of the family Fabaceae.  It is endemic to coastal areas of tropical West Africa, also growing inland along riverbanks, and is found in Cameroon, Côte d'Ivoire, Nigeria, and Ghana. It is threatened by habitat loss.

References

Millettieae
Flora of West Tropical Africa
Trees of Africa
Vulnerable plants
Taxonomy articles created by Polbot